The list of ship commissionings in 1884 includes a chronological list of all ships commissioned in 1884.


References 
 navsource.org

See also 

1884
 Ship commissionings